CBF-FM-10 is a French-language Canadian radio station located in Sherbrooke, Quebec.

Owned and operated by the (government-owned) Canadian Broadcasting Corporation (French: Société Radio-Canada), it broadcasts on 101.1 MHz with an effective radiated power of 35,000 watts (class B) using an omnidirectional antenna.

The station has an ad-free news/talk format and is part of the Ici Radio-Canada Première network, which operates across Canada. Like all Première stations, but unlike most FM stations, it broadcasts in mono.

The station first went on the air in the early 1980s as a rebroadcaster of CBF in Montreal. For many years, Radio-Canada programming had aired on privately owned affiliate CHLT. However, in 1979, CHLT received permission to disaffiliate from Radio-Canada as soon as Radio-Canada could set up its own station there. Despite Sherbrooke's large size, the CBC opted not to open a full-fledged station there at first.

However, in 2000, the CBC received permission to upgrade its Sherbrooke operation to a full-fledged station, despite retaining a rebroadcaster-like call sign.

The station's current local programs are Par ici l'info from and Écoutez l'Estrie. On public holidays, its local programs are replaced with local shows airing provincewide (Quebec) produced by different outlets in turn (except Montreal and Quebec City). The Saturday morning program, Samedi et rien d'autre, originates from CBF-FM.

Transmitters

References

External links
Ici Radio-Canada Première

BF-10
BF
BF-10
Year of establishment missing